Christopher Oualembo (born 31 January 1987) is a Congolese former professional footballer.

Club career
Oualembo began his career with Paris SG. Then he joined US Quevilly for the 2006–07 season. In January 2007 he moved to Levante UD and left the club in May 2008. On 30 July 2009 he joined Monza. On January 22, 2012 he signed with Chernomorets Burgas. He was released in early June 2012. On October 15, 2012 he signed with Lechia Gdańsk.

After two seasons in Poland, Oualembo moved to Portugal signing a two-year deal with Académica de Coimbra. He made his debut in a 0-2 home defeat against S.L. Benfica.

International career
He made his first cap for Congo DR national football team against Gabon on 25 March 2008.

Honors

National
DR Congo
Africa Cup of Nations bronze:2015

References

External links

1987 births
Living people
Sportspeople from Saint-Germain-en-Laye
French footballers
Democratic Republic of the Congo footballers
Democratic Republic of the Congo international footballers
Democratic Republic of the Congo expatriate sportspeople in Spain
Association football defenders
A.C. Monza players
PFC Chernomorets Burgas players
Paris Saint-Germain F.C. players
Atlético Levante UD players
US Quevilly-Rouen Métropole players
Lechia Gdańsk players
Associação Académica de Coimbra – O.A.F. players
First Professional Football League (Bulgaria) players
Ekstraklasa players
Primeira Liga players
Expatriate footballers in Spain
Expatriate footballers in Poland
Expatriate footballers in Italy
Expatriate footballers in France
Expatriate footballers in Bulgaria
Expatriate footballers in Portugal
French sportspeople of Democratic Republic of the Congo descent
2015 Africa Cup of Nations players
Footballers from Yvelines
Black French sportspeople